I Have No Cannons That Roar is an album dedicated to the memory of Irfan Ljubijankić, who was killed towards the end of the Bosnian war in 1995 when the helicopter he was flying in on a mercy mission was shot down by a Serb rocket. He was returning from a visit to his home town of Bihac, at that time the front line against the attacking forces. A few months earlier in his role as the Foreign Minister of Bosnia he had been in London. He met Yusuf Islam there and gave him a cassette of a song he had written and recorded at home, entitled "Have No Cannons That Roar". His hope was that Yusuf would use it in some way to help the Bosnian cause. The song was subsequently translated into English and combined with other songs famous in Bosnia during the war. Some of the songs are included here without change, others were re-recorded in London and Stuttgart. Two new songs specially written for this project by Yusuf Islam, including "The Little Ones". The album ends with a 50-second spoken word piece by Yusuf Islam expressing hope that Bosnia will recover.

Track listing
 "Mother, Father, Sister Brother" (Abd al-Lateef Whiteman)
 "When Adhans are Called" (Senad Podojak)
 "The Blossoms Blown" (Burhan Saban)
 "Where are Makkah And Madina" (Aziz Alili)
 "Spring Of Tasnim" (Senad Podojak)
 "Hey Homeland" (Aziz Alili)
 "Allah is Enough For Me" (Aziz Alili)
 "Last Flight" (Abd Al-Alteef Whiteman)
 "I Have No Cannons That Roar" (Dino Merlin)
 "The Little Ones" (Yusuf Islam)
 "I Am A Son Of Yours" (Senad Podojak)  
 "Summary"

References

2000 compilation albums
Cat Stevens compilation albums